Amina Doherty is a Nigerian/Antiguan feminist, artist and women's rights advocate. As an African-Caribbean feminist and women's rights advocate, her work is centered around raising awareness for social justice through movement-building, and innovative approaches to philanthropy and grantmaking. Amina's work takes many forms: art exhibitions, community programs, cultural events, philanthropic advising, and grantmaking initiatives.

Education 
Amina Doherty graduated from McGill University with a bachelor's degree in Political Science & Women's Studies (Distinction). She holds a master's degree in Gender, Development and Globalisation from the London School of Economics.

Career 
Amina Doherty began her career working as a researcher at the Directorate of Gender Affairs in Antigua and Barbuda where she led research for the national report to CEDAW, the Caribbean Policy Development Centre (CPDC) and the Caribbean Association for Feminist Research and Action (CAFRA).

Doherty is a founding member and first Director of FRIDA | The Young Feminist Fund, an organization that aims to strengthen the capacity of young feminist organisations around the world through small grants. Previously, Amina managed funding for women's rights organisations at the Sigrid Rausing Trust, one of the largest private human rights funding organizations in Europe. She has worked with a diverse range of clients including governments, international NGOs, community-led groups and individual philanthropists. From 2014 - 2019 Amina worked at the Association for Women’s Rights in Development (AWID), an international feminist membership organisation that serves to support, resource and strengthen women's rights organisations and movements.

Since 2019, Doherty is the Program Director for the Women’s Voice and Leadership-Caribbean Project at The Equality Fund - a dynamic partnership between leading actors in feminist organizing, global philanthropy and impact investing.

Doherty currently sits on the board of the Global Fund for Women, one of the world's leading foundations for gender equality. She has served in an advisory capacity to Mama Cash, the African Women’s Development Fund (2014-2016), the African Feminist Forum, Just Associates (JASS), Foundation for a Just Society (2014), Comic Relief (2014), The MATCH International Women's Fund (2013), and the University of the West Indies (Caribbean Institute in Gender and Development).

Together with Jessica Horn, she is a co-creator for Our Space is Love, an online community platform.

Invited Meetings, Lectures & Presentations 
 “Contributions of Women, the Young and Civil Society to the Post-2015 Development Agenda,” High-Level Event of the United Nations General Assembly, New York, USA (March 2014).
 African Women's Creative Non-Fiction Writing Residency”, The African Women's Development Fund & FEMRITE, Entebbe, Uganda (July 2014). 
 ‘Negotiating Belongings. Transnational Feminism: The Question of Migrant Women in Europe,’ (Discussant) University of Mainz, Mainz, Germany (September 2014).

Articles, Video & Media Work 
 "Changing Systems, Changing Lives" , Association for Women's Rights and Development 
 "Young Women Speak Out" Video Blog (Vlog) Series, Sylvia Global Media Network
 The GREAT Interview
 18 phenomenal African Feminists to know and celebrate
 Women's Rights in Africa
Simply Antigua Barbuda - Tourism Coffee Table Book  (Artist Spotlight)

References 

Living people
McGill University alumni
Nigerian activists
Alumni of the London School of Economics
Year of birth missing (living people)